Irene C. Fountas (born 14 August 1948) is an American educational whole language theorist. She teaches at Lesley University as the Marie M. Clay Endowed Chair for Early Literacy and Reading Recovery.

References

Living people
American educational theorists
Lesley University faculty
1948 births